Magnolia faustinomirandae is a species of tree endemic to the Chiapas Highlands of Chiapas, Mexico.

Range and habitat
Magnolia faustinomirandae is found only in the municipality of Jitotol, Chiapas. Its known extent of occurrence (EOO) is less than 100 km2.

It grows in open cloud forests at 1600 meters elevation, with species of pine and oak, Liquidambar styraciflua, Nyssa sylvatica, and Brunellia mexicana.

Conservation
The species' conservation status is assessed as critically endangered. Its cloud forest habitat has been severely fragmented and degraded by deforestation over the past two decades.

References

faustinomirandae
Endemic flora of Mexico
Trees of Chiapas
Cloud forest flora of Mexico
Chiapas montane forests
Plants described in 2013